Lucy Smith may refer to:
 Lucy Smith (legal scholar) (1934–2013), Norwegian legal scholar and professor of law
 Lucy Smith (radio presenter) (born 1994), radio presenter on Triple J
 Lucy Harth Smith (1888–1955), educator, writer and activist
 Lucy Mack Smith (1775–1856), mother of Joseph Smith, Jr., founder of the Latter Day Saint movement
 Lucy Masey Smith (1861–1936), New Zealand editor, feminist, temperance and welfare worker
 Lucy Toulmin Smith (1838–1911), Anglo-American antiquarian and librarian
 Lucy Wilmot Smith (1861–1889), American teacher, journalist, suffragist and historian
 Elder Lucy Smith, also known as Lucy Turner Smith (1874–1952), African-American Pentecostal pastor and healer